Mishon Tarique Ratliff (born February 3, 1993) is an American singer, dancer and actor. Though he's been singing and performing on stage since the age of 6, he is best known for his portrayal of Taylor "Tay" Sutton on the ABC Family drama television series Lincoln Heights. He has appeared on music television broadcast such as Soul Train, America's Most Talented Kid, The Mo'Nique Show and BET's 106 & Park. As well as being an artist/actor, Mishon is a musician who plays the keyboard and both acoustic/electric guitar.

Discography

Studio albums

Extended plays

Mixtapes

Singles

As lead artist

As featured artist

Filmography

Films

Television

Theatre

References

Links
 Official Website
 
 Mishon's Facebook
 Mishon's Instagram
 Mishon's Twitter
 Mishon's YouTube
 Mishon's Soundcloud

1993 births
Living people
21st-century American male actors
Male actors from California
African-American male actors
American male dancers
American male child actors
American male film actors
American male television actors
21st-century African-American people